Steve Forrest may refer to:

 Steve Forrest (actor) (1925–2013), American film and television actor born William Forrest Andrews
 Steve Forrest (musician) (born 1986), American musician with the band Placebo
 Steven Forrest (astrologer) (born 1949), American astrologer, author and lecturer